Drakulić is a Christian Serbian surname, derived from the Romanian words Dracul and Dracula, and may refer to:

 Saša Drakulić (born 1972), Serbian footballer
 Slavenka Drakulić (born 1949), Croatian writer and publicist

Serbian surnames